Ark or ARK may refer to:

Biblical narratives and religion

Hebrew word teva
 Noah's Ark, a massive vessel said to have been built to save the world's animals from a flood
 Ark of bulrushes, the boat of the infant Moses

Hebrew aron
 Ark of the Covenant, chest for the tablets of the Ten Commandments
 Torah ark, a cabinet used to store a synagogue's Torah scrolls

Businesses and organizations
 Ark (charity), UK
 Ark (toy company), a former company
Ark Invest, American asset management firm
 ARK Music Factory, a record label, Los Angeles, California, US
 The Ark, a weekly newspaper in Tiburon, California
ARK Theatre Company in Los Angeles, California, US

Media, arts and entertainment

Fiction

Works of fiction
 The Ark (Doctor Who), a 1966 Doctor Who serial
 Ark, a 1970 apocalyptic short film directed by Rolf Forsberg
 Ark II, a 1976 children's science fiction television series
 ARK (1996), a book of poetry by Ronald Johnson 
 Ark (film), a 2005 animated science fiction film directed by Subro Adonis
 "The Ark" (Stargate Atlantis), a 2007 episode of Stargate Atlantis
 Ark (novel), a 2009 novel by Stephen Baxter
 Ark (web series), a 2010 science fiction series by Trey Stokes
 The Ark (film), a 2015 BBC TV film
 Ark: Survival Evolved, a 2017 video game
 The Ark (TV series), a 2023 SyFy television series

Fictional story elements
 Ark (Gravitation), character in Gravitation
 Ark (Noon Universe), a planet
 Ark (Transformers), a spacecraft
 The Ark (Halo), control station
 ARK, space colony in video games Sonic Adventure 2 and Shadow the Hedgehog
 Ark, character in video game Terranigma
 The Ark, space stations housing humanity in The 100 (TV series)
 The Ark, a floating city and the main setting of the game Brink
 The Ark, fictional English pop rock band from Alice Oseman's third novel I Was Born For This

Music

Bands 
 Ark (British band), a 1985 melodic rock band
 Ark (Bangladeshi band), a 1991 Bangladeshi rock band
 The Ark (Swedish band), a 1991 Swedish glam-rock band
 Ark (Norwegian band), a 1999 progressive metal band

Albums 
 Ark (The Animals album), 1983, by The Original Animals
 The Ark (album), 1991 album by Frank Zappa
 The Ark (EP), 1996, by Swedish band The Ark
 Ark (L'Arc-en-Ciel album), 1999, by Japanese rock band L'Arc-en-Ciel
 Here Comes the Indian, 2003 album by Animal Collective, reissued in 2020 as Ark
 Ark (Brendan Perry album), 2010, by Brendan Perry
 Ark (We Are the Ocean album), 2015, by We Are the Ocean
 Ark (In Hearts Wake album), 2017, by In Hearts Wake

Songs 
 "The Ark", 2008, by Dr. Dog from Fate

Poetry
"Ark", 2019 poem by Simon Armitage to commemorate launch of RRS Sir David Attenborough

Video games
Ark: Survival Evolved, a 2017 action adventure survival video game

Places

Buildings
 The Ark (fortress), 5th century AD, Bukhara, Uzbekistan
 The Ark (Duke University), an 1898 dance studio
 The Ark (folk venue), since 1965, Ann Arbor, Michigan, US
 The Ark (Prince Edward Island), a 1975 bioshelter in Canada
 The Ark, London, a 1989 office block in Hammersmith, London, UK
 Ark Encounter, a 2016 creationist theme park, Kentucky, US

Inhabited places
 Ark., an alternative abbreviation for Arkansas, United States
 Ark, Iran (disambiguation)
 Ark, Missouri, a ghost town in the United States
 Ark, Virginia, in Gloucester County, Virginia, United States
Autonomous Region of Krajina, in Bosnia and Herzegovina

Other places
 The Ark (Antarctica), a rock summit in Antarctica

Transportation
 Ark (river boat), a temporary boat used in river transport in eastern North America
 , a prestigious ship name in the British Royal Navy, often the name of the Fleet Flagship, has been given to five ships
 The Ark (ship), a ship used in founding the Province of Maryland
 The Ark, a ship used as a Scottish Marine Station, now the basis of the University Marine Biological Station Millport
 The Ark, an unfinished sculpture in the form of a functional ship created by artist Kea Tawana between 1982 and 1988 in Newark, New Jersey
 Interstellar ark, a conceptual multi-lifetime space vehicle
Ararat International Airlines, by ICAO airline designator
Arusha Airport, by IATA airport code
Arkadelphia (Amtrak station), by Amtrak station code
Armoured Ramp Carrier, a specialist armoured vehicle

Technology
 ARK (Archival Resource Key), a type of URL that serves as a persistent identifier for scientific and cultural objects
 , a software distribution founded by Bernhard Rosenkränzer
 Ark (search engine), a people search engine
 Ark (software), an archiving tool
 Hongmeng OS, an Android-compatible mobile operating system by Huawei
Archaeological Recording Kit, a database and GIS web-based recording system for archaeology

Other uses 
 Ark Prize of the Free Word, a literary prize
ARK (Atomska Ratna Komanda), a nuclear command bunker near Konjic, Bosnia and Herzegovina
Netherlands Court of Audit (Algemene Rekenkamer)
ARK (Access Research Knowledge), Northern Ireland Social and Political Archive

See also
 Chicken ark, a mobile shelter for domestic chickens
 Knowledge ark, a collection of knowledge preserved in such a way that future generations would have access to said knowledge if current means of access were lost

 Arc (disambiguation)
 ARC (disambiguation)
 Arch (disambiguation)
 Arkana (disambiguation)
 ARRC (disambiguation)